The Limelite was a broadsheet weekly newspaper that served Loring Air Force Base from 1953 to 1994.

External links
Mentions online
Images of select covers of Limelite, in 1988 and 1989

Loring Air Force Base
Defunct newspapers published in Maine
United States Air Force publications
Newspapers established in 1953

Publications disestablished in 1994
1953 establishments in Maine
1994 disestablishments in Maine
Military newspapers published in the United States